Doesburg is a city in the Netherlands.

It may also refer to:

Michel Doesburg, Dutch football player
Theo van Doesburg, Dutch artist
Pim Doesburg, Dutch football goalkeeper
Lloyd Doesburg, Dutch football goalkeeper